Philadelphia County is a county in the Commonwealth of Pennsylvania. It is the most populous county in Pennsylvania and the 24th most populous county in the nation. As of the 2020 census, Philadelphia County had a population of 1,603,797. Its county seat is Philadelphia, the nation's sixth-largest city.

Philadelphia County is one of the three original counties, along with Chester and Bucks counties, created by William Penn in November 1682. Since 1854, the county has been coextensive with the City of Philadelphia which is also its county seat. Philadelphia County is the core county in the Philadelphia-Camden-Wilmington Combined Statistical Area (PA-NJ-DE-MD, also known as the Delaware Valley), located along the lower Delaware and Schuylkill Rivers, within the Northeast megalopolis. Philadelphia County is the economic and cultural anchor of the Delaware Valley, the eighth-largest combined statistical area in the United States with an estimated population of 6.096 million as of 2020.

History

Native American tribes of Lenape were the first known occupants in the area that became Philadelphia County. The first European settlers were Swedes and Finns who arrived in 1638. The Netherlands seized the area in 1655, but lost control to England in 1674. William Penn received his charter for Pennsylvania from Charles II of England in 1681, and in November 1682 he divided Pennsylvania into three counties. During the same year, Philadelphia was planned and was made the county seat and the capital of the Province of Pennsylvania.

Penn wanted Philadelphia, meaning "love brotherly", to be a place where religious tolerance and the freedom to worship were ensured.  Philadelphia's name is shared with an ancient city in Asia Minor mentioned by the Bible's Book of Revelation. It was William Penn's desire, as a  Quaker, that his "Holy Experiment" would be found blameless at the Last Judgment.

When established, Philadelphia County consisted mainly of the area from the Delaware River west between the Schuylkill River to the south and the border with Bucks County to the north; the western boundary was undefined. Two counties would be formed out of Philadelphia County, Berks County which was formed in 1752 (from parts of Chester, Lancaster, and Philadelphia counties), and Montgomery County established in 1784. From these separations, as well as other border changes, was created the present-day boundaries of the county.

Philadelphia, as planned by Penn, comprised only that portion of the present day city situated between South and Vine Streets and the Delaware and Schuylkill Rivers. Other settlements were made beyond the boundaries of the city, and in the course of time they became  incorporated separately and had separate governments.

Several of these settlements were situated immediately contiguous to the City of Philadelphia, such as Southwark and Moyamensing in the south, the Northern Liberties District, Kensington, Spring Garden and Penn District to the north, and West Philadelphia and Blockley to the west — which combined with the City of Philadelphia formed practically one continuously urban area, the whole group being known abroad simply as Philadelphia.

Besides these, there were a number of other outlying townships, villages and settlements throughout the county. Over time, as the population expanded out from the City of Philadelphia, those closer to the City of Philadelphia became absorbed into Philadelphia.

During this period, the city government of Philadelphia and the county government of Philadelphia acted separately. By the mid-19th century, a more structured government bureaucracy was needed. A reform charter, on February 2, 1854, defined all the boroughs, townships and districts of the County of Philadelphia as being within the City of Philadelphia, thus abolishing the patchwork of cities, boroughs, and townships that had comprised Philadelphia County since its founding.

The city-county consolidation was a result of the inability of a colonial-type government by committees to adapt to the needs of a growing city for new public services, for example, better streets, police, transportation, sanitation and schools.

The newly integrated districts had marked characteristics between them, but over time, after the consolidation, these characteristics were generally integrated into the City of Philadelphia. Presently, the names of some of these old districts survive as the names of neighborhoods in the city, with their boundaries roughly matching their historic boundaries.

In 1951, a new law known as the Home Rule Charter merged city and county offices completely. This new charter provided the city with a common structure and outlined the "strong mayor" form of government that is still used.

The county offices were merged with the city government in 1952, effectively eliminating the county as a government. Even though the county no longer has a government structure by law, in both the Unconsolidated Pennsylvania Statutes and The Philadelphia Code and Charter, the County of Philadelphia is still an entity within the Commonwealth of Pennsylvania. It is thus subject to the provisions and laws of the Commonwealth concerning counties. Exceptions include restrictions stated in the Home Rule Charter of Philadelphia, Act of Consolidation, 1854, and subsequent legislation. The county also is the only First Class County, meaning it had a population of 1.5 million or more at the last census, in the Commonwealth.

Philadelphia has become racially and ethnically diverse over the years, and this process continues. Since 1990, (the year that immigration began increasing), thousands of immigrants from Latin America, Asia and Europe have arrived in the county. Presently, the city has some of the largest Irish, Italian, German, Polish, Puerto Rican, Korean, Vietnamese, Russian, Ukrainian, Jamaican, Chinese, Arab, Thai, and Cambodian populations in America. The county has the fourth largest concentration of African Americans in North America, including large numbers of Liberians, Nigerians, and Sudanese. The Northeast section of the city, and more significantly the suburbs of Philadelphia, contain large numbers of Indian Americans and Mexicans.

At the 2010 census, the city was 41.0% White, 43.4% Black or African American, 0.5% American Indian or Alaskan Native, 6.3% Asian, 0.0% Native Hawaiian, 2.8% two or more race, and 5.9% were some other race. 12.3% of the population were Hispanic or Latino.

Geography
It is the second-smallest county in Pennsylvania by area. Bodies of water include the Delaware River, Schuylkill River, Cobbs Creek, Wissahickon Creek, and Pennypack Creek.

The lowest point in the county is 10 feet above sea level near Fort Mifflin in Southwest Philadelphia, at the convergence of the Delaware and Schuylkill Rivers. The highest point is in Chestnut Hill, at 432 feet above sea level, near Evergreen Place, just north and west of Evergreen Avenue. Philadelphia County is Pennsylvania's second smallest county by land area, after Montour County.

Counties adjacent
Bucks County (northeast)
Burlington County, New Jersey (east)
Camden County, New Jersey (southeast)
Gloucester County, New Jersey (south)
Delaware County (southwest)
Montgomery County (northwest)

Major roads and highways

Demographics

At the 2000 census, there were 1,517,550 people, 590,071 households and 352,272 families residing in the county. The population density was 11,233.6/square mile (4,337.3/km2). Hispanic or Latino of any race were 8.5% of the population. The five largest ancestries include Irish (13.6%), Italian (9.2%), German (8.1%), Polish (4.3%), and English (2.9%).

Of the 590,071 households, 27.6% had children under the age of 18 living with them, 32.1% were married couples living together, 22.3% had a female householder with no husband present, and 40.3% were non-families. 33.8% of all households were made up of individuals, and 11.9% had someone living alone who was 65 years of age or older. The average household size was 2.48 and the average family size was 3.22.

25.3% of the population were under the age of 18, 11.1% from 18 to 25, 29.3% from 25 to 45, 20.3% from 45 to 65, and 14.1% who were 65 years of age or older. The median age was 34 years. For every 100 females there were 86.8 males. For every 100 females age 18 and over, there were 81.8 males. The median household income was $30,746 and the median family income was $37,036. Males had a median income of $34,199 compared with $28,477 for females. The per capita income for the county was $16,509. About 18.4% of families and 22.9% of the population were below the poverty line, including 31.3% of those under age 18 and 16.9% of those age 65 or over.

2020 Census

Government
Currently, Philadelphia County has no government structure. Prior to the Act of Consolidation in 1854, a Board of Commissioners governed the county in accordance with the law of Pennsylvania at the time. The origins of the Board of Commissioners are found in the office of Tax Assessor of Philadelphia County, established by an Act of the Pennsylvania General Assembly on November 27, 1700. Tax Assessor was an office of six persons, elected annually to estimate the county's fiscal needs, to make an assessment and levy a tax to meet them, and to appoint its collectors and the County Treasurer.

On March 28, 1710, the Assembly approved an act that created an appointed Board of County Commissioners, which was changed to a notable elected board in 1725. The Commissioners were empowered to demand accountings of the Assessors and Collectors and to appoint new collectors if necessary. Subsequent acts passed by the Assembly in 1715, 1718 and 1722 increased the power and the scope of the Board, granting the Commissioners authority to share with the assessors in the assessment process and in the allocation of tax receipts among the various county projects, to participate in the appointment of the County Treasurer, and to issue warrants and levy fines against delinquent taxpayers and collectors. Other Acts passed during the eighteenth century gave the Commissioners regulatory powers and maintenance functions in regard to county lands, roads, bridges, wharves and landings, courts and the county prison.

In 1780, the Assembly passed an Act that abolished the Board of County Assessors and left its functions with the Commissioners alone, who continued to appoint the assessors and collectors of each of the county's boroughs, townships and districts. Further legislation in 1799 and 1805 formally established the Commissioners' functions of furnishing lists of voters to election officers and aiding the Sheriff in the selection of jurors, as both were based upon lists of taxpayers. During the first half of the nineteenth century, the Commissioners' duties were further increased to include the leasing of polling places, the provision of ballot boxes, and related duties.

Consolidation in 1854

The consolidation of the City and County of Philadelphia in 1854 abolished the Board of County Commissioners, with most of its functions transferred to the popularly elected City Commissioners who, although retaining their original title and duties, were thenceforth considered County officers. Because the City Commissioners were considered County officers, they were still regulated  by state laws concerning County Commissioners. The City Commissioners should not be confused with the City Council, as these are two separate entities.

Even though the governments of both the City and County were effectively consolidated by the Act of Consolidation, not all offices and agencies, such as the Board of Inspectors of the County Prison (Philadelphia Prison System), Coroner, Recorder of Deeds, and Sheriff, that were controlled by the county prior to the consolidation were transferred to the city, though their oversight and regulation were now managed by the City Commissioners. Other offices and agencies, like that of Offices of City Tax Collector and County Tax Collector were reduced to that of clerk in the new office of Receiver of Taxes. Both Commissioners' (City and County) powers in regard to streets and City property were transferred to the city's Departments of Highways and City Property. From 1854 until 1867, the Commissioners also served as members of the Board of Revision of Taxes. In 1867, the City Assessors were made appointees of that Board.

The powers left to the Commissioners were chiefly accounting ones concerning county institutions, regulatory duties regarding weights and measures (given them by an Act of 1895) and administrative functions in association with elections, which culminated in complete control of their conduct with the formation of the County Board of Elections under their direction in 1937.

Philadelphia Home Rule Charter
Although not mentioned in the Philadelphia Home Rule Charter, the City Commissioners' Office became part of the City government by way of the 1951 City-County Amendment to the State Constitution. Additionally, the 1963 amendment to the First Class Cities Home Rule Act gave City Council the power to pass legislation with regard to operations of the City Commissioners' Office. The 1965 City-County Consolidation Ordinance of City Council further enabled these enactments.

Politics

Philadelphia County is overwhelmingly Democratic, having given the Democratic presidential candidate their largest percentage of any county in Pennsylvania in every election since 1968. The county has voted for the Democrat in every presidential election since 1936. In 1972, it was the only county in the state to vote for George McGovern over Richard Nixon. Even Republican Senator Arlen Specter, a Philadelphia resident, did not receive one third of the Philadelphia vote in the 2004 U.S. Senate election, which he won easily. In his first senate election, in 1980, he did win the county, which was the last time any Republican won the county in a statewide election; however, Specter switched to the Democratic Party in 2009 and was defeated in the 2010 Democratic Primary.

State House of Representatives

State Senate

United States House of Representatives

United States Senate

Communities

The following districts, townships, and boroughs existed in Philadelphia County before the Act of Consolidation of 1854:

City
Philadelphia (County Seat)

Boroughs and Townships
Aramingo Borough
Belmont District
Blockley Township
Bridesburg Borough
Bristol Township
Byberry Township
Delaware Township
Frankford Borough
Germantown Borough
Germantown Township
Kensington District
Kingsessing Township
Lower Dublin Township
Manayunk Borough
Moreland Township
Moyamensing District
Northern Liberties District
Northern Liberties Township
Oxford Township
Passyunk Township
Penn District
Penn Township
Richmond District
Roxborough Township
Southwark District
Spring Garden District
West Philadelphia Borough
Whitehall Borough

Climate 

According to the Köppen climate classification system, Philadelphia County has a humid subtropical climate.
The average January temperature in Center City is 33.6 °F.

Notable people

See also

National Register of Historic Places listings in Philadelphia

References

External links
Philadelphia Code and Charter
Philadelphia Home Rule Charter

 
1682 establishments in Pennsylvania
Populated places established in 1682
Majority-minority counties in the United States